Warwickite is an iron magnesium titanium borate mineral with the chemical formula  or . It occurs as brown to black prismatic orthorhombic crystals which are vitreous and transparent. It has a Mohs hardness of 3 to 4 and a specific gravity of 3.36.

Occurrence
It occurs metasomatized limestone skarns and in lamproite and carbonatite veinlets. It was first described in 1838 near Warwick, Orange County, New York. It has also been reported from Bancroft, Ontario; in Murcia Province, Spain; in Siberia and near
Pyongyang, North Korea.

References

Iron(II) minerals
Magnesium minerals
Titanium minerals
Borate minerals
Orthorhombic minerals
Minerals in space group 62